Serena Williams was the defending champion, but lost in the quarterfinals to Mary Pierce.

Lindsay Davenport won the title, defeating Martina Hingis in the final 4–6, 6–4, 6–0.

Seeds 
A champion seed is indicated in bold text while text in italics indicates the round in which that seed was eliminated.

Draw

Finals

Top half

Section 1

Section 2

Section 3

Section 4

Bottom half

Section 5

Section 6

Section 7

Section 8

References
 2000 Indian Wells Masters Women's Draw

Singles women
Indian Wells Masters